Satti Venkata Krishna Reddy is an Indian film director, screenwriter,  composer, and actor known for his works predominantly in Telugu cinema. He has garnered three state Nandi Awards and the Filmfare Best Telugu Director Award.

His notable films include Rajendrudu Gajendrudu (1993), Mayalodu (1993), Yamaleela (1994), Number One (1994), Subha Lagnam (1994), Ghatothkachudu (1995), Maavichiguru (1996), Vinodam (1996), Egire Paavurama (1997), Aahvaanam (1997), Premaku Velayara (1999), Sardukupodaam Randi (2000), Sakutumba Saparivaara Sametham (2000), Pellam Oorelithe (2003), Athade Oka Sainyam (2004), and Hungama (2005). In 2012 he directed the romantic comedy Divorce Invitation, an American film.

Early life and film career
Krishna was born in Konkuduru village, East Godavari district of Andhra Pradesh. After his post graduation in Bheemavaram, he moved to Hyderabad and scripted Kobbari Bondam (1991). He played a small role in the 1986 film Kirathakudu.

Memberships
DGA - Directors Guild of America
TFDA - Telugu Film Directors Association

Awards
Nandi Awards
2001 - Best Director - Sakutumba Saparivaara Sametham
1997 - Special Jury Award for Aahvaanam

Filmfare Awards South 
1994 - Filmfare Best Director Award (Telugu) - Subhalagnam

Filmography

Film

Cameo appearances 
 Kirathakudu (1986)
 Sambaram (2003)
 Nenu Meeku Baaga Kavalsinavaadini (2022)

Television
 Yamaleela Aa Taruvatha (ETV Telugu)

References

1966 births
Living people
Telugu film directors
Telugu screenwriters
20th-century Indian film directors
Andhra University alumni
Nandi Award winners
Film producers from Andhra Pradesh
Indian male screenwriters
Hindi-language film directors
English-language film directors
Filmfare Awards South winners
20th-century Indian composers
Musicians from Andhra Pradesh
Telugu playback singers
Telugu film score composers
Film directors from Andhra Pradesh
Screenwriters from Andhra Pradesh
21st-century Indian film directors
People from East Godavari district